Placogobio nahangensis is a species of cyprinid in the genus Placogobio. It inhabits Vietnam and has been assessed as "data deficient" on the IUCN Red List.

References

Cyprinid fish of Asia
IUCN Red List data deficient species
Fish of Vietnam